Mick van Buren (born 24 August 1992) is a Dutch professional footballer who plays as a striker for Czech First League club Slavia Prague.

Club career
Born in Ridderkerk, Netherlands, van Buren joined Excelsior from SV Slikkerveer as a teenager. Aside from a brief spell at Feyenoord, he played for the Dutch club until the summer of 2013. During his time with SBV Excelsior, he scored 13 goals in 27 appearances in the Dutch Eerste Divisie.

van Buren's performances caught the attention of Esbjerg fB. On 4 July 2013, he became new manager Niels Frederiksen's first signing, joining on a free transfer and agreeing a three-year long contract with the defending Danish Cup champions.

Slavia Prague
In July 2016 van Buren moved to Czech First League club Slavia Prague.
During a pre-season friendly, Van Buren scored a hat trick against OGC Nice. It took him 14 league games to score a goal for Slavia, eventually scoring twice in their 4–0 home win against Mladá Boleslav on 27 August 2017.
On 9 May 2018 he played as Slavia Prague won the 2017-18 Czech Cup final against Jablonec.

On 22 November 2018, van Buren signed a new contract with Slavia until the summer of 2021.

Personal life
Born in Ridderkerk, he was raised at local side Slikkerveer. His father Leo van Buren was also a professional footballer and he is a grandson of former Dutch international player Theo Laseroms.

Career statistics

Honours
Slavia Prague
 Czech First League: 2016–17, 2018–19, 2019–20, 2020–21
 Czech Cup: 2017–18, 2018–19, 2020–21

References

External links
 Mick van Buren on Esbjerg fB
 
 
 Danmarks Radio player profile

1992 births
Living people
Footballers from Ridderkerk
Association football forwards
Dutch footballers
Excelsior Rotterdam players
Eredivisie players
Eerste Divisie players
Esbjerg fB players
Danish Superliga players
SK Slavia Prague players
ADO Den Haag players
SK Dynamo České Budějovice players
Dutch expatriate footballers
Dutch expatriate sportspeople in Denmark
Expatriate men's footballers in Denmark
Dutch expatriate sportspeople in the Czech Republic
Expatriate footballers in the Czech Republic
FC Slovan Liberec players